Kids Top 20 is a television show for kids, currently broadcast in the Netherlands (AVROTROS) and France (Télétoon+). The show revolves around a pop music chart for kids.

Sources

 
 
 
 
 
 

Flemish television shows
Dutch children's television series